Murrumbidgee is a former electoral district of the Legislative Assembly in the Australian state of New South Wales, named after the Murrumbidgee River.

History

Until its abolition, Murrumbidgee and Parramatta were the only electorates to have existed continuously since the first Legislative Assembly election in 1856, although before 1913 it was called The Murrumbidgee. It elected two members between 1856 and 1859, one member between 1859 and 1880, two members between 1880 and 1885, three members between 1885 and 1894 and one member between 1894 and 1920. Voters cast a vote for each vacancy. Between 1920 and 1927, it absorbed parts of Lachlan and Ashburnham and elected three members under proportional representation. From 1927 until its abolition at the 2015 election, it elected one member.

At the 2007 election it included most of Junee Shire (including Junee, Wantabadgery, Harefield, Old Junee and Junee Reefs) Temora Shire, Coolamon Shire, Bland Shire, part of Lachlan Shire (including Condobolin, Lake Cargelligo and Burcher), Narrandera Shire, Leeton Shire, the City of Griffith, Murrumbidgee Shire and part of Carrathool Shire (including Rankins Springs and Carrathool).

Murrumbidgee was abolished at the 2015 election with the recreated electoral district of Cootamundra absorbing Junee Shire, Temora Shire, Coolamon Shire, Bland Shire and Narrandera Shire, the recreated electoral district of Murray absorbing Leeton Shire, the City of Griffith, Murrumbidgee Shire and Carrathool and the Electoral district of Barwon absorbing Lachlan Shire.

Members for Murrumbidgee

Election results

References

Former electoral districts of New South Wales
1856 establishments in Australia
Murrumbidgee
2015 disestablishments in Australia
Murrumbidgee